Okshovo is a rural locality (a village) in Dmitriyevogorskoye Rural Settlement, Melenkovsky District, Vladimir Oblast, Russia. The population was 94 as of 2010.

Geography 
Okshovo is located 26 km southeast of Melenki (the district's administrative centre) by road. Muratovo is the nearest rural locality.

References 

Rural localities in Melenkovsky District